Sinum is a genus of predatory sea snails, marine gastropod mollusks in the subfamily Sininae of the family Naticidae, the moon snails. 

Most naticids have shells that are globular, but the shell of species in the genus Sinum is flattened to some extent, some being so flattened that they are ear-shaped.

Distribution
This marine species is cosmopolitan.

Species
Species within the genus Sinum include:

 Sinum bifasciatum (Récluz, 1851)
 Sinum concavum (Lamarck, 1822)
 Sinum cortezi Burch & Burch, 1964
 Sinum cymba (Menke, K.T., 1828)
 Sinum debile (Gould, 1853)
 Sinum delesserti (Récluz in Chenu, 1843)
 Sinum diauges Kilburn, 1974
 Sinum eximium (Reeve, 1864)
 †  Sinum faviai Lozouet, 2001
 Sinum grayi G. P. Deshayes, 1843
 Sinum haliotoideum (Linnaeus, 1758)
 Sinum incisum (Reeve, 1864)
 † Sinum infirmum Marwick, 1924
 Sinum japonicum (Lischke, 1872)
 Sinum javanicum (Gray, 1834)
 Sinum keratium Dall, 1919
 Sinum laevigatum (Lamarck, 1822)
 Sinum maculatum (Say, 1831)
 † Sinum marwicki Laws, 1930
 Sinum minus (Dall, 1889)
 Sinum nanhaiense S.-P. Zhang, 2009
 Sinum neritoideum (Linnaeus, 1758)
 Sinum noyesii Dall, 1903
 Sinum perspectivum (Say, 1831)
 Sinum planulatum (Récluz, 1843)
 Sinum quasimodoides Kilburn, 1976
 Sinum sanctijohannis (Pilshry & Lowe, 1932)
 Sinum scopulosum (Conrad, 1849)
 Sinum vittatum Zhang, 2008
 Sinum zonale (Quoy & Gaimard, 1832)

The Indo-Pacific Molluscan database also mentions the following species with names in current use
 Sinum unifasciatus Récluz, 1843
Species brought into synonymy
 Sinum acuminatus (Adams & Reeeve, 1850): synonym of Conuber conicum (Lamarck, 1822)
 Sinum californicum I. Oldroyd, 1917: synonym of Sinum scopulosum (Conrad, 1849)
 Sinum cuvierianum (Récluz, 1844): synonym of Vanikoro cuvieriana (Récluz, 1844)
 Sinum fuscum Röding, 1798: synonym of Sinum haliotoideum (Linnaeus, 1758)
 Sinum insculptus Adams & Reeve, 1850: synonym of Sinum javanicum (Gray, 1834)
 Sinum latifasciatus Adams & Reeve, 1850: synonym of Sinum neritoideum (Linnaeus, 1758)
 Sinum minor [sic]: synonym of Sinum minus (Dall, 1889)
 Sinum nanhaiensis S.-P. Zhang, 2009: synonym of Sinum nanhaiense S.-P. Zhang, 2009 (wrong gender agreement of specific epithet)
 Sinum papilla (Gmelin, 1791): synonym of Eunaticina papilla (Gmelin, 1791)
 Sinum parvus (E. A. Smith, 1895): synonym of Sinum neritoideum (Linnaeus, 1758)
 Sinum petitianus Récluz, 1843: synonym of Sigaretus petitianus Récluz in Chenu, 1843  (taxon inquirendum)
 Sinum pazianum Dall, 1919: synonym of Sinum debile (Gould, 1853)
 Sinum planatum: synonym of Sinum planulatum (Récluz, 1843)
 Sinum sinuatus Récluz, 1851: synonym of Sigaretus sinuatus Récluz, 1851 (taxon inquirendum)
 Sinum tener (Smith, 1894): synonym of Eunaticina papilla (Gmelin, 1791)
 Sinum weberi (Bartsch, 1918): synonym of Sinum incisum (Reeve, 1864)

References

 Blainville, 1818. Sur un nouveau genre de mollusques, Cryptostome, Cryprostomus. Nouveau Bulletin des Sciences, par la Société Philomatique de Paris 1818: 120-122
 MacNae, W. & M. Kalk (eds) (1958). A natural history of Inhaca Island, Mozambique. Witwatersrand Univ. Press, Johannesburg. I-iv, 163 pp.
 Iredale, T. & McMichael, D.F. 1962. A reference list of the marine Mollusca of New South Wales. Memoirs of the Australian Museum 11: 1-109
 Wilson, B. 1993. Australian Marine Shells. Prosobranch Gastropods. Kallaroo, Western Australia : Odyssey Publishing Vol. 1 408 pp. 
 Gofas, S.; Le Renard, J.; Bouchet, P. (2001). Mollusca, in: Costello, M.J. et al. (Ed.) (2001). European register of marine species: a check-list of the marine species in Europe and a bibliography of guides to their identification. Collection Patrimoines Naturels, 50: pp. 180–213
 Rolán E., 2005. Malacological Fauna From The Cape Verde Archipelago. Part 1, Polyplacophora and Gastropoda.
 Torigoe K. & Inaba A. (2011). Revision on the classification of Recent Naticidae. Bulletin of the Nishinomiya Shell Museum. 7: 133 + 15 pp., 4 pls.

External links
 Röding, P.F. 1798. Museum Boltenianum sive Catalogus cimeliorum e tribus regnis naturae quae olim collegerat Joa. Hamburg : Trappii 199 pp. 
 Lamarck, J.B.P.A. de Monet de 1799. Prodrome d'une nouvelle classification de coquilles, comprenent une réaction appropiée de charactères génériques, et l'établissement d'un grand nombre de genres nouveaux. Mémoires de la Société d'Histoire Naturelle de Paris 1: 63-91
 Iredale, T. 1931. Australian molluscan notes. No. 1. Records of the Australian Museum 18(4): 201-235, pls xxii-xxv

Naticidae